Víctor Morales (born 11 July 1982) is a Belizean football player who currently plays for San Pedro Dolphins.

External links

1982 births
Living people
Belizean footballers
Belize international footballers
2005 UNCAF Nations Cup players
2007 UNCAF Nations Cup players
2009 UNCAF Nations Cup players
2011 Copa Centroamericana players

Association football midfielders
San Pedro Seadogs FC players